Nairobi Arboretum is located along state house road in the area of Kilimani, Nairobi Kenya. It was founded in 1907 by Mr. Batiscombe in a bid to try out new forestry trees.  It was later gazetted as a national reserve in 1932 by the government and issuance of a title deed was later conducted by the commissioner of lands to the government in 1996.

References

External links
Official website

Nairobi
Parks in Kenya
Forests of Kenya
Arboreta